Mohegan (also Monegan) is an unincorporated community on the Tug Fork River in McDowell County, West Virginia, United States. It sits at an altitude of 1,230 feet (375 m).

The community was named after the Mahican Indians.

References

Unincorporated communities in McDowell County, West Virginia
Unincorporated communities in West Virginia
Coal towns in West Virginia